Michelson is a patronymic surname meaning "son of Michel". A common English language surname, there are other English and Scandinavian spellings. It is rare as a given name. People with the name Michelson include:

 Albert Abraham Michelson (1852-1931), American physicist, first U.S. citizen to win a Nobel Prize in science
 Gary K. Michelson (born 1949), American orthopedic spinal surgeon and inventor
 Harold Michelson (1920-2007), American illustrator
 Leo Michelson (1887-1978), Latvian-American artist
 Lisa Michelson (1958-1991), American actress
 Peter Michelson, American physicist
 Richard Michelson (born 1953), American writer and poet
 Robert C. Michelson (born 1951), American researcher, progenitor of the field of aerial robotics
 Truman Michelson (1879–1938), American Indo-Europeanist
 Ivan Ivanovich Michelson (1740-1807) Baltic-German military commander, general in the Russian Imperial Army

See also
 Michaelson
 Mickelson
 Michaelsen
 Michelsen

Patronymic surnames
Surnames from given names